Vance Powell is an American six-time Grammy Award winning record producer, engineer and mixer. His credits include Phish, Chris Stapleton, Jack White, Tyler Bryant & The Shakedown, The Raconteurs, The Dead Weather, The White Stripes, Arctic Monkeys, Wolfmother, Deadly Apples, Seasick Steve, Black Prairie, The Revivalists, Tinariwen, JEFF the Brotherhood, Daniel Ellsworth & The Great Lakes, and Martina McBride, among many others.

Life and career
Powell made his start in live sound, touring with local Missouri bands as a front of house engineer. In 1986, he conducted his first professional studio recording session as an engineer at Rick Massey's 'Massey Studio', stepping in for the main engineer who was sick at the time. That same year he became the studio's engineer. In 1990-'93 he took a position at Lou Whitney's Column One Studio in Springfield, MO. as second engineer, recording scores of regional bands and artists. Shortly after, Powell moved to Nashville, TN, accepting a position as a monitor engineer for Tammy Wynette. The position turned into Production Manager/Front of House (FOH) Engineer, which he did until 1997, when he joined global sound reinforcement company, Clair Brothers Audio.

In 1998 he started a long relationship with Jars of Clay taking a front of house position that continued through 2002. During that time several recording projects with them emerged, including their full length 2002 release (and 2003 Grammy Award winner) "The Eleventh Hour".

In early 2002 John McBride asked him to help build and run Blackbird Studio, a single room semi-private facility for his wife, country music superstar Martina McBride. The single room semi-private facility soon became an eight room world class facility hosting projects such as Neil Young's “Heart of Gold” motion picture soundtrack and The Dixie Chicks' six time Grammy Award winning “Taking the Long Way”. Powell remained the Chief Engineer at Blackbird for seven years.

Projects outside of Blackbird soon beckoned, and Powell began working extensively with Jack White's groups including The Raconteurs, The White Stripes, and The Dead Weather, as well as many of White's production jobs such as Wanda Jackson's "The Party Ain't Over", as well as Jack White and Alicia Keys' production of "Another Way to Die" from the James Bond film Quantum of Solace.

Powell is the co-owner of Sputnik Sound, a recording and mixing facility he set up in 2006 together with producer/engineer Mitch Dane. Powell met White for the first time in 2006, when he worked on Danger Mouse and Daniel Luppi's Rome album, on which White guested. Recent Sputnik Sound projects include Phish, Tinariwin, Seasick Steve, Leagues, Bobby Bare, Jr., Red Fang, De Staat, Diarrhea Planet, A Thousand Horses, Willie Nelson, Neil Young, Wolfmother, Arctic Monkeys and Chris Stapleton.

Awards
Powell has won four Grammy Awards for his work on the albums listed below.

 Jars of Clay - The Eleventh Hour (Best Pop/Contemporary Gospel Album 2002), engineer.
 The Raconteurs - Consolers of the Lonely (Best Engineered Album, non-classical 2009), engineer & mixer - shared with Joe Chiccarelli and Jack White.
 Buddy Guy - Living Proof (Best Contemporary Blues Album 2011), engineer.
 Chris Stapleton - "Traveller" (Best Country Album 2015), engineer & mixer.

In 2015, Chris Stapleton's album "Traveller" won three Country Music Association Awards (CMAs) including "Album of The Year" and "New Artist of The Year". The album also received Grammy nominations for Album Of The Year, Best Country Song, Best Country Album (win), Best Country Solo Performance (win). The album was engineered and mixed by Powell.

Selected discography
The production, engineering and mixing discography for Vance Powell is as follows.

References

Living people
American audio engineers
Year of birth missing (living people)